Notospeophonus is a genus of beetles in the family Carabidae, containing the following species:

 Notospeophonus castaneus Moore, 1962
 Notospeophonus jasperensis Moore, 1964
 Notospeophonus pallidus Moore, 1964

References

Harpalinae